Isotamm is an Estonian language surname. Notable people with the surname include:

 (1900–1967), military general and lecturer
Ingrid Isotamm (born 1979), actress
Jaan Isotamm (1939–2014), poet

Estonian-language surnames